Musabeyli is a village in Alaplı District, Zonguldak Province, Turkey. The mukhtar is Cengiz Duman.

Infrastructure 
The village has no educational facilities. There are water pipelines and sewage pipelines. There are no post offices but there are 2 health organizations. The road that transports people to the village is asphalt. The village has electricity and cable phone. The post code is 67850.

References 

Villages in Alaplı District